The Narrative Corpse is a chain story, or comic jam, by 69 all-star cartoonists based on Le Cadavre Exquis (see Exquisite corpse), a popular game played by André Breton and his surrealist friends to break free from the constraints of rational thought.

Edited by Art Spiegelman and Robert Sikoryak, The Narrative Corpse features contributions from some of the most notable cartoonists of its time from the worlds of underground comix, alternative comics, and European comics (as well as Will Eisner and Mort Walker).

The Narrative Corpse graphic novel, co-published by Gates of Heck and Raw Books, had a limited run in 1995 of 9,500 copies. It was the winner of the 1996 Firecracker Alternative Book Award for Best Graphic Novel.

Story structure 
The creative process was designed as follows: a cartoonist would begin the story with three black-and-white comic-book panels, starring an innocent stick figure named "Sticky". This cartoonist passes his or her three panels on to the next cartoonist, who continues the story in any manner he or she wants with three more panels. The next cartoonist receives only the previous cartoonists's part of the story, and so on.

Although the "story" oscillates without beginning or end, it can be said to start (after some creative editing by Spiegelman and Sikoryak) with the panels done by Drew Friedman, and end with the ones done by Richard McGuire.

Some contributors featured cameos by their own well-established characters (for example Mort Walker's Sarge, S. Clay Wilson's the Checkered Demon, Will Eisner's Spirit, Matt Groening's Akbar & Jeff, and Bill Griffith's Zippy the Pinhead). It is also of interest that background or guest characters seldom last more than three contributions in a row.

Publication history 
The idea was first conceived of in May 1990, as a project for Raw magazine. To expedite the project, two strands were started simultaneously, one in New York City by project co-editor R. Sikoryak, the second in London by Savage Pencil. Nevertheless, the project kept growing (outliving RAW itself, which ceased publication in 1991) until it was forcibly brought to an end five years after its inception.

In order to bridge the two strands, R. Sikoryak's original opening panels were cut, although he later drew the oddly-shaped "splash panel" that now begins the narrative. Spiegelman himself drew the three panels that link Strand 1 to Strand 2 (bridging the contributions of Joe Sacco and Savage Pencil), while Richard McGuire was brought in to link Strand 2 back to Strand 1 (bridging the contributions of Carol Swain and Drew Friedman).

Contributors 

The following is a list of contributors in the order their work appears in The Narrative Corpse:
R. Sikoryak > Mark Beyer > Gilbert Hernandez > Mary Fleener > M. K. Brown > David Mazzucchelli > Mort Walker > S. Clay Wilson > Chester Brown > Debbie Dreschler > Mark Landman > Jay Lynch > Gary Leib > Willem > Carol Lay > Jason Lutes > Max Andersson > J. Pirinen > Peter Bagge > G. Wasco > Spain > Carol Swain > Richard McGuire > Drew Friedman > David Sandlin > Ever Meulen > Mariscal > Joost Swarte > Pascal Doury > Georgeanne Deen > Chris Ware > Charles Burns > Lorenzo Mattotti > Justin Green > Julie Doucet > Kaz > Gary Panter > Daniel Clowes > Jonathon Rosen > Krystine Kryttre > Jaime Hernandez > Scott Gillis > Jim Woodring > Paul Corio > Will Eisner > Carol Tyler > Max Cabanes > Gilbert Shelton > Scott McCloud > Typex > José Muñoz > Matt Groening > Joe Sacco > Art Spiegelman > Savage Pencil > Jaques Loustal > Robert Crumb > Aline Kominsky-Crumb > Kamagurka & Herr Seele > Thomas Ott > Bruno Richard > Kim Deitch > Ben Katchor > Lynda Barry > Mark Zingarelli > Richard Sala > Bill Griffith > Jayr Pulga

Contributors by genre

Alternative comics 
 Peter Bagge
 Lynda Barry
 Mark Beyer
 Chester Brown
 Charles Burns
 Daniel Clowes
 Paul Corio
 Julie Doucet
 Debbie Drechsler
 Mary Fleener
 Drew Friedman
 Scott Gillis
 Matt Groening
 Los Bros Hernandez
 Ben Katchor
 Kaz
 Krystine Kryttre
 Mark Landman
 Carol Lay
 Gary Leib
 Jason Lutes
 David Mazzucchelli
 Scott McCloud
 Richard McGuire
 Gary Panter
 Savage Pencil
 Jonathon Rosen
 Joe Sacco
 Richard Sala
 David Sandlin
 R. Sikoryak
 Carol Swain
 Carol Tyler
 Chris Ware
 Jim Woodring
 Mark Zingarelli

Underground comix  
 M. K. Brown
 Robert Crumb
 Georganne Deen
 Kim Deitch
 Justin Green
 Bill Griffith
 Aline Kominsky-Crumb
 Jay Lynch
 Gilbert Shelton
 Spain
 Art Spiegelman
 S. Clay Wilson

European cartoonists 
 Max Andersson
 Max Cabanes
 Pascal Doury
 Kamagurka & Herr Seele
 Jacques Loustal
 Mariscal
 Lorenzo Mattotti
 Ever Meulen
 José Antonio Muñoz
 Thomas Ott
 J. Pirinen
 Jayr Pulga
 Bruno Richard
 Joost Swarte
 Typex
 G. Wasco
 Willem

Other 
 Will Eisner
 Mort Walker

References

External links
 Gates of Heck
 The Infinite Corpse, an online collaborative comic inspired by The Narrative Corpse
 Discussion of The Narrative Corpse and The Infinite Corpse at the Center for Cartoon Studies' Schulz Library Blog

Artists' books
1995 graphic novels
Comics anthologies
Collaborative fiction